Janine Ghobert (24 April 1931 – 18 December 2022) was a Belgian jurist and politician of the Liberal Reformist Party (PRL).

Biography
Ghobert earned a doctorate in law and specialized in political science and international relations. She was honorary vice-president of the King Baudouin Foundation and honorary president of Solidarité Libérale internationale. She was vice-president of the Comité national pour la célébration 40-60 du roi Baudouin Ier de Belgique.

Ghobert served in the Senate from 7 December 1981 to 24 November 1991 and was a member of the Chamber of Representatives from 24 November 1991 to 21 December 1992. On the latter date, she was nominated to be a judge on the Constitutional Court, a mandate from which she retired on 24 April 2001.

Ghobert was the wife of Baron . She died in Ixelles on 18 December 2022, at the age of 91.

Decorations
Officer of the Order of Leopold
Grand Officer of the National Order of the Lion
Officer of the Order of the Republic of Tunisia

References

1931 births
2022 deaths
Belgian jurists
Reformist Movement politicians
Members of the Chamber of Representatives (Belgium)
Members of the Senate (Belgium)
Politicians from Ghent